Phungling Municipality (previously also Taplejung Municipality) is a municipality located in Taplejung District in the Province No. 1 of Nepal. 
The municipality was formed merging the then two Village Development Committees of Phungling and Dokhu in May 2014. At the time of the 2011 Nepal census it had a population of 19,085 people and 4,480 individual households.

Background
Phungling was a Village Development Committee along with other 49 VDCs in Taplejung District before 2014. At the time of 2011 Nepal census, it had total population of 14,974 individuals and 3571 households.  On 8 May 2014, Government of Nepal announced 72 new municipalities. The government merged 283 VDCs to create 72 new municipalities.  Dokhu VDC was merged with Phungling VDC to form new Taplejung Municipality.

On 10 March 2017, Nepal restructured the old administrative system into 753 new local level body thus Hangdeva, Phurumbu and Phawakhola VDCs merged with the then Taplejung municipality and renamed it as Phungling Municipality.

It is located at 27°21'0N 87°40'0E with an altitude of 1441 metres (4730 feet).

Demography 
The main inhabitants in Phungling are Limbu, Chhetri, Tamang, Brahman, Sherpa, Bhote, Newar, and Gurung.

Transportation 
Phungling Municipality is linked with roadway and airway. It is connected to rest of the country through the Mechi Highway, a 268-km road which begins in Kechana of Jhapa district and ends in Taplejung. Passenger buses and jeeps to Taplejung are easily available in Birtamod. Suketar Airport has flights from Biratnagar and Kathmandu.

Media 
To promote local culture Phungling has 3 FM radio stations: Radio Tamor - 102.0 MHz which is a community radio station, Taplejung F.M. - 94.0 MHz and Radio Faktanglung 89.8 MHz.

Pathibhara Devi Temple
One of the major attractions is the Pathibhara Devi Temple. This little-known region attracts tourists seeking spiritual fulfillment and blessings from the powerful Pathibhara Devi. Kiranti, Hindus and Buddhists reach the temple for celebrations during special occasions. The trek to pathibhara Devi (3794 m) combined with the natural and cultural experiences of the region make the visit a unique exhilarating experience. It takes a day to reach the temple on foot from Taplejung Bazaar. On the way to the temple are many species of rhododendron which are unique.

Climate
Phungling has a subtropical highland climate (Cwb) with cool, dry winters and warm, rainy summers.

Notable person
Chhurim, mountaineer, first woman to climb Everest twice in the same season.
 Te-ongsi Sirijunga Xin Thebe: Limbu martyr and legend.
Til Kumar Menyangbo Limbu: Politician
Surya Man Gurung:Politician
Sanduk Ruit

References

External links
UN map of the municipalities of Taplejung District

Populated places in Taplejung District
Nepal municipalities established in 2014
Municipalities in Koshi Province
Hill stations in Nepal
Municipalities in Taplejung District